Page High School is a high school in Page, Arizona, United States. It is part of the Page Unified School District. It opened in 1959.

Page USD, and therefore Page High School, serves a portion of Page as well as Bitter Springs, LeChee and most of Kaibito CDP.

References

Public high schools in Arizona
Schools in Coconino County, Arizona
Educational institutions established in 1959
Page, Arizona
1959 establishments in Arizona